Sylvia Sidney (born Sophia Kosow; August 8, 1910 – July 1, 1999) was an American stage, screen and film actress whose career spanned over 70 years. She rose to prominence in dozens of leading roles in the 1930s. She was nominated for the Academy Award for Best Supporting Actress for her performance in Summer Wishes, Winter Dreams in 1973. She later gained attention for her role as Juno, a case worker in the afterlife, in Tim Burton's 1988 film Beetlejuice, for which she won a Saturn Award as Best Supporting Actress.

Early life
Sidney was born Sophia Kosow in the Bronx, New York, the daughter of Rebecca (née Saperstein), a Romanian Jew, and Victor Kosow, a Russian-Jewish immigrant who worked as a clothing salesman. Her parents divorced by 1915, and she was adopted by her stepfather Sigmund Sidney, a dentist. Her mother became a dressmaker and renamed herself Beatrice Sidney. Now using the surname Sidney, Sylvia became an actress at the age of 15 as a way of overcoming shyness. As a student of the Theater Guild's School for Acting, she was praised by theater critics for her performances. In 1926, she made her first film appearance as an extra in D.W. Griffith's The Sorrows of Satan.

Career

During the Depression, Sidney appeared in a string of films, often playing the girlfriend or sister of a gangster. She appeared with Gary Cooper, Spencer Tracy, Henry Fonda, Joel McCrea, Fredric March, George Raft and Cary Grant. Among her films from this period were: An American Tragedy, City Streets, and Street Scene (all 1931), Alfred Hitchcock's Sabotage and Fritz Lang's Fury (both 1936), You Only Live Once and Dead End (both 1937), and The Trail of the Lonesome Pine, an early three-strip Technicolor film. During this period, she developed a reputation for being difficult to work with.
At the time of making Sabotage with Alfred Hitchcock, Sidney was one of the highest-paid actresses in the industry, earning $10,000 per week—earning a total of $80,000 for Sabotage.

Her career diminished somewhat during the 1940s. In 1949, exhibitors voted her "box-office poison". In 1952, she played the role of Fantine in Les Misérables, and although the film itself did not meet the studio's expectations, Sidney received critical praise for her performance.

She appeared three times on Playhouse 90. On May 16, 1957, she appeared as Lulu Morgan, mother of singer Helen Morgan in "The Helen Morgan Story". Four months later, Sidney rejoined her former co-star Bergen on the premiere of the short-lived The Polly Bergen Show. She also worked in television during the 1960s on such programs as Route 66, The Defenders, and My Three Sons.

In 1973, Sidney received an Academy Award nomination for her supporting role in Summer Wishes, Winter Dreams. As an elderly woman, Sidney continued to play supporting screen roles, and was identifiable by her husky voice, the result of cigarette smoking. She was the formidable Miss Coral in the film version of I Never Promised You a Rose Garden and later was cast as Aidan Quinn's grandmother in the television production of An Early Frost for which she won a Golden Globe Award. She played Aunt Marion in Damien: Omen II and had key roles in Beetlejuice (directed by longtime Sidney fan Tim Burton), for which she won a Saturn Award, and Used People. Her final role was in Mars Attacks!, another film by Burton, in which she played an elderly woman whose beloved records by Slim Whitman help stop an alien invasion from Mars.

On television, she appeared in the pilot episode of WKRP in Cincinnati as the imperious owner of the radio station, and she appeared in a memorable episode of Thirtysomething as Melissa's tough grandmother, who wanted to leave her granddaughter the family dress business, though Melissa wanted a career as a photographer. Sidney also appeared at the beginning of each episode as the crotchety travel clerk on the short-lived late-1990s revival of Fantasy Island. She also was featured on Starsky & Hutch, The Love Boat, Magnum, P.I., Diagnosis Murder, and Trapper John, M.D..

Her Broadway career spanned five decades, from her debut performance as a graduate of the Theatre Guild School in June 1926 at age 15, in the three-act fantasy Prunella to the Tennessee Williams play Vieux Carré in 1977. Other stage credits included The Fourposter, Enter Laughing, and Barefoot in the Park. In 1982, Sidney was awarded the George Eastman Award by George Eastman House for distinguished contribution to the art of film.

Personal life 
Sidney was married three times. She first married publisher Bennett Cerf on October 1, 1935, but the couple divorced six months later on April 9, 1936. She later married actor and acting teacher Luther Adler in 1938, by whom she had her only child, a son Jacob ("Jody"; 1939–1987), who died of Lou Gehrig's disease while his mother was still alive. Adler and Sidney divorced in 1946. On March 5, 1947, she married radio producer and announcer Carlton Alsop; they divorced on March 22, 1951.

A Democrat, Sidney supported Adlai Stevenson's campaign during the 1952 presidential election.

She published two books on the art of needlepoint, and raised and showed pug dogs.

Death 
Sidney died on July 1, 1999, from esophageal cancer at the Lenox Hill Hospital in Manhattan. She underwent chemotherapy, which proved unsuccessful, and died a month before her 89th birthday. Her remains were cremated.

Filmography

Film

Television

Radio appearances

References

Sources 
 Miller, Sally, Sylvia: A Memoir Of Hollywood Star Sylvia Sidney, Synergy Book Service (September 15, 2004), /

External links 

 Cum a ajuns Sylvia Sydney, fiica unei croitorese din Bacău, să ia minţile bărbaţilor de la Hollywood. Românca era văzută ca simbol al frumuseţii perfecte, 21 May 2016, Ionela Stănilă, Adevărul

1910 births
1999 deaths
American adoptees
American film actresses
American television actresses
American stage actresses
American people of Romanian-Jewish descent
American people of Russian-Jewish descent
Best Supporting Actress Golden Globe (television) winners
Deaths from cancer in New York (state)
Deaths from esophageal cancer
Jewish American actresses
People from the Bronx
20th-century American actresses
Actresses from New York City
California Democrats
New York (state) Democrats
20th-century American Jews